"Lick It" is a song recorded by American dance music group 20 Fingers featuring singer Roula, released in February 1995 as the second single from their debut album, On the Attack and More (1994). It also appears on 20 Fingers' self-titled second studio album and peaked at number-one in Italy. The song contains explicit lyrics that refer to cunnilingus. A black-and-white music video was also made.

Critical reception
Larry Flick from Billboard wrote that a song like this "has lyrics that do not venture beyond adolescent humor and raunchy
chatter, with slammin' grooves and contagious melodies serving as the real attention grabber". He added that it "has singer Roula cooing and giggling on the joys of oral gratification." James Hamilton from Music Week'''s RM Dance Update described it as a "deadpan girl chanted 'Short Dick Man' follow-up's jauntily throbbed 127bpm" track.

Chart performance
The song achieved success in many European countries. It topped the Italian singles chart and was a top 10 hit in five countries; Austria, Belgium, France, Germany (number four) and Spain (number four). On the Eurochart Hot 100, "Lick It" reached number six. On the US Billboard Hot 100, the song peaked at number 72. In Canada, it went to number two on both The Record singles chart and the RPM'' Dance/Urban chart. However, its sales were lower than 20 Fingers' previous hit "Short Dick Man".

Track listings

Charts and sales

Weekly charts

Year-end charts

Certifications

In media
In 1995, the mashup "Don't Laugh But Lick It" has been released as 20 Fingers & Winx feat. Roula, compromising "Lick It"  with "Don't Laugh" by DJ Winx. In the Sensation White party in Amsterdam 2009, there has been released a special remix of "Lick It" with the original vocals of Roula, with go-go dancers background. In 2009, DJ Felli Fel heavily samples "Lick It" in his song "Feel It" featuring T-Pain, Sean Paul, Flo Rida and Pitbull.

Credits
 Written by Charlie Babie and Manny Mohr
 Produced by 20 Fingers
 Vocals by Roula
 Published by Tango Rose Music (ASCAP)
 Licensed from SOS Records
 J.J. 'S underground mix and J.J. 'S bass radio mix : remixed by JJ Flores
 Onofrio club mix : remixed by Onofrio Lollino
 J.J. brothers remix : remixed by J.J. Brothers
 Alternative remix :  remixed by Piano, Trivellato, Sacchetto and J.J. Brothers
 Evolution team radio edit, Evolution team house mix and Evolution team faster mix : remixed by Evolution
 Kamasutra remix : remixed by Kamasutra

References

1994 songs
1995 singles
20 Fingers songs
Black-and-white music videos